Thunderbird is a steel roller coaster in the Thanksgiving section of Holiday World & Splashin' Safari amusement park in Santa Claus, Indiana. Designed by Bolliger & Mabillard, the ride opened in 2015 as the eighth Wing Coaster in the world and the fourth in the United States.

Thunderbird is B&M's first launched coaster in sixteen years and their first launch coaster built in-house (The Incredible Hulk Coaster at Universal's Islands of Adventure uses a launch system supplied by the park). Thunderbird had its first test run on March 8, 2015 and opened to the public on April 25, 2015.

History
On July 24, 2014, Holiday World announced that they would be opening Thunderbird for the 2015 season. It would be the park's first major steel coaster, as well as the first launched wing coaster in the United States. Thunderbird would also be the first roller coaster at the park to go upside down. The track and supports began arriving at the park the following week. By October, the first two inversions were topped off. The new trains were shown off during IAAPA 2014. Then, the track layout was completed on December 2, 2014.

Thunderbird officially opened on April 25, 2015. Prairie Farms Dairy released an ice cream flavor called "Thunderbird" to advertise the new ride. This flavor was a combination of vanilla ice cream with a touch of caramel and more spicy, roasted pecans.

Ride experience
After loading in the station, the train moves forward and stops. The train immediately goes into a  Immelmann loop. After the first element, the train then goes down its first drop into a  vertical loop, the tallest vertical loop on a Wing Coaster, surpassing Wild Eagle at Dollywood. After the vertical loop, the train crosses over the valley between The Voyage's second and third hills, goes through an overbanked turn, and then an overbanked elevated spiral in the mirrored direction. The train then goes through a zero-g-roll parallel to The Voyage. After several curves next to The Voyage's triple-down drop and spaghetti bowl, the train dips down into a barn (which is the keyhole) where it then curves left back into the barn by doing an inline twist, crossing over The Voyage's underground tunnels. Once the inline twist ends the train enters the brake run. From the brake run, the track makes a right turn to another set of brakes before entering the station. One cycle of the ride lasts about 1 minute and 18 seconds.

Characteristics

Location

Thunderbird is located in the Thanksgiving theme section of the park along with The Voyage and it runs parallel and crosses over The Voyage twice: after the vertical loop and during the  inline twist.

PGAV Destinations is the theming designer for Thunderbird. The designers took the Thunderbird name and coaster design and created a visual theme of the legendary bird’s powerful flight through farms and forests of southern Indiana.

Manufacturer
Thunderbird is a Wing Coaster model manufactured by Swiss roller coaster firm Bolliger & Mabillard. It is Holiday World & Splashin' Safaris first major steel roller coaster. Thunderbird is the eighth Wing Coaster to be built and the fourth in the United States, the others being X-Flight at Six Flags Great America, Wild Eagle at Dollywood and GateKeeper at Cedar Point. Thunderbird is the first Bolliger & Mabillard coaster to utilize an LSM launch. An earlier launched coaster, The Incredible Hulk roller coaster at Islands of Adventure, Universal Orlando, utilizes a pinch-wheel drive system that was designed exclusively for Universal Studios by Universal Creative.

Trains
Thunderbird operates with two open-air steel and fiberglass trains, each with five cars of four seats each, with two on each side of the track. Each train holds 20 riders and the ride has a capacity of about 1,140 riders per hour. Because the seats are on the side of the track, a cantilevered steel arm is used to support the wings.

Track

Launch system
Every launch requires 2.5 megawatts of power, with the energy being stored in electric generators with two massive 24,000-pound flywheel assemblies. The launch system mechanics are located in a separate building known as Will Power. The name came from the park's former president Will Koch, who died in 2010.

Reception
Thunderbird was ranked in the Amusement Today's Golden Ticket Awards for best new ride of 2015 with 9.5% of the vote, to come in fifth place.

References

External links

 

Holiday World & Splashin' Safari
Roller coasters in Indiana